Roscommon Courthouse is a judicial facility located on Abbey Street, Roscommon, County Roscommon, Ireland.

History
The courthouse, which was designed by Sir Richard Morrison in the neoclassical style and built in ashlar stone, was completed in 1832. It was built beside the new gaol (now the site of Roscommon garda station) to replace the previous courthouse, which is now known as Harrison Hall and which currently houses a branch of the Bank of Ireland. The courthouse was gutted by a major fire on the evening of Wednesday 14 June 1882. The fire was started accidentally when a gas leak was ignited in the courthouse. A half-gale was blowing that evening, and within half an hour the building was in flames. When the roof collapsed in the conflagration, the sparks were carried by the strong winds to the roofs of nearby thatched houses, and the fire continued to spread. All of the thatched houses in the vicinity were quickly destroyed.

The courthouse was restored under the architectural guidance of Christopher Mulvany in 1883. The building was originally used as a facility for dispensing justice but, following the implementation of the Local Government (Ireland) Act 1898, which established county councils in every county, it also became the meeting place for Roscommon County Council. The county council moved to Áras an Chontae in December 2015, leaving the courthouse for the sole use of Roscommon Circuit and District Courts.

In December 2022, due to the dilapidated condition of the courthouse, the sittings of Roscommon Circuit and District Courts were moved to a temporary facility in the former Fairyland dance hall on the Racecourse Road. The Courts Service has indicated its intention to refurbish the courthouse when funding becomes available.

Architecture
The design involves a symmetrical main frontage with five bays facing Abbey Street; the central section of three bays, which slightly projects forward, features a short flight of steps leading up to a hexastyle portico with Doric order columns supporting an entablature and a frieze. There are three sash windows on the first floor and a cornice and a cupola at roof level.

There is a mosaic of the Roscommon crest on the floor of the entrance lobby, which is a reminder of Roscommon's former mosaic industry. There is a large portrait of Douglas Hyde, the first president of Ireland, hanging over the main staircase.
 
The courthouse was originally built with a tunnel leading to the adjacent gaol, for the easy transfer of prisoners. The gaol has long since closed, been demolished and replaced with Roscommon Garda station. However, the courthouse end of the tunnel remains in place.

References

Buildings and structures in County Roscommon
Courthouses in the Republic of Ireland